Ahava, in Hebrew love, may indicate:
Ahava Dead Sea Laboratories, an Israeli cosmetics company with headquarters in Lod
Ahava rabbah, a prayer and blessing that is recited by followers of Ashkenazi Judaism during Shacharit
Ahava Raba, blessing recited before the Shema
Ahava (Bible), name of a biblical canal or river mentioned in the Book of Ezra
Ahva, Israel, a village in Israel
Ahava (crater), a crater on Venus

See also 
 Achawa (disambiguation)
 Ahva (disambiguation)